The 2019 Russian Artistic Gymnastics Championships was held in Penza, Russia between 6–10 March 2019.

Medalists

Results

All-Around

Vault

Uneven Bars

Balance Beam

Floor Exercise

References

External links
  Official site

Russian Artistic Gymnastics Championships
Artistic Gymnastics Championships
Russian Artistic Gymnastics Championships
March 2019 sports events in Russia